Nguyễn Phương Khánh is a Vietnamese model and beauty queen who was crowned Miss Earth 2018. She is the first Vietnamese woman to win the Miss Earth title, one of the Big Four international beauty pageants.

Early life and education 
Phương Khánh was born April 5, 1995) and raised in Bến Tre Province, in the Mekong Delta region of Vietnam. Her parents divorced and her mother, Nguyễn Thi Phuong was a secondary school teacher in Thạnh Phú District in Bến Tre Province. She has two brothers and one of which is a prominent make-up artist in Vietnam, Hy Nguyễn.

She is a marketing student in Curtin Singapore, a branch campus of Australia's Curtin University. She is expected to graduate in early 2019 and plans to take Master of Business Administration on the same university.

She is fluent in Vietnamese, French, and English.

Pageantry

Early age and local pageant 
Phương Khánh was 15 years old when she first watched Miss Earth when Vietnam hosted Miss Earth 2010 in Nha Trang and instantaneously, it became her dream to represent her nation in the pageant. Her elder brother, Hy, was Miss Vietnam Lưu Thị Diễm Hương's makeup artist during the pageant.

In April 2018, Phương Khánh placed 2nd runner-up at Miss Sea Vietnam Global pageant, earning cash prize worth VND 200 million (USD 8,770).

Miss Earth Vietnam 2018 Casting 
In August 2018, Phương Khánh joined the Leading Miss Earth Vietnam, a casting event organized by the Vietnamese franchise holder to select Miss Earth Vietnam 2018 and representatives to other beauty pageants and modelling events. Miss Earth 2015 Angelia Ong is one of the judges in the event. She was announced as Miss Earth Vietnam 2018 at a later date after getting approval from Ministry of Culture, Sports and Tourism.

Miss Earth 2018 

She represented Vietnam at Miss Earth 2018 pageant held on November 3, 2018 at Mall of Asia Arena in Pasay, Metro Manila, Philippines, where she won and was crowned by her predecessor, Miss Earth 2017 Karen Ibasco from the Philippines.

During the competition, she won sponsor awards; Miss Puerto Princesa Centro Hotel, Miss Robig Builders and Miss Ruj Beauty Care & Spa. As well as gold medals for National Costume competition (Asia and Oceania) and Evening Gown competition (Water Group) and a silver medal for Swimsuit competition (Water Group).

In the final question and answer round, the top four contestants were asked the same question: "Being a millennial, what do you think is the most pressing issue of your generation?" She answered:Good evening, everyone. My answer is our ignorance. We have so many technologies, and we just use social media and only care about ourselves. We should spend our time to think and feel with what's happening with the Earth right now. One small action multiplied by a million people can transform the world.

Her achievement also marked Vietnam's first win at one of the Big Four international beauty pageants.

Media and environmental activism 
Phương Khánh officially returned to Vietnam a week after winning the Miss Earth 2018 pageant with a grand welcome by her family, friends, and supporters at the Tan Son Nhat International Airport on November 11, 2018. She was presented at a press conference held at the White Palace Convention Center in Ho Chi Minh City on November 12, 2018.

She visited her former school and presented gifts to disadvantaged people in her hometown in Bến Tre Province on November 16, 2018. A welcome and gratitude party in Ho Chi Minh City was held on December 11, 2018 to celebrate her feat in Miss Earth which was attended by Miss Earth 2017 Karen Ibasco and Miss Earth Air 2016 Michelle Gómez from Colombia.

She became the cover of Harper's Bazaar women's fashion magazine in its December 2018 Vietnam edition and was featured with an interview about her life and success in the Miss Earth pageant.

In January 2019, she received the Inspirational Journey Award in the annual WeChoice Awards in Vietnam for her achievement in Miss Earth pageant and contributions to the community from various garbage collection campaigns in the river and campaigns to gradually change living habits to have a great significance in protecting the environment.

Phương Khánh led a Trash Challenge on March 22, 2019, by cleaning the garbage below Saigon Bridge crossing the Saigon River, with Korean singer Han Sara and Vietnamese pop group Uni5.

She was designated as the Ambassador of the Earth Hour 2019 in March 2019 to promote the event and to implement several environmental protection activities. As ambassador, Phuong Khanh urged everyone to voluntarily turn off unnecessary lights and equipment for an hour, contributing to spreading the message "Save Energy, Save Earth - Energy saving, Earth protection".

On March 24, 2019,  Phương Khánh attended the launching of Vietnam Olympic Run as an annual sports activity organized by the Vietnam's Ministry of Culture, Sports and Tourism to promote sports campaign and celebrate the 73 years of success in the sports industry. She was also a guest in the 'Elegant Student Vietnam' competition finals organized by the Ho Chi Minh City Film and Television University on March 28, 2019.

She celebrated her birthday on April 5, 2019 by participating in a blood donation campaign organized by the National Institute of Haematology and Blood Transfusions in Vietnam to ease the blood supply shortage in hospitals throughout country.

Phương Khánh launched a project through the Southern Customs Office Department in Vietnam on April 10, 2019 and awarded 20 scholarships worth 1 million VND to 20 students with financial difficulties, awarded a youth project of a sterile drinking water supply system for Nhon Chau High School and 2 sterilized drinking water machines for Thon Tay Kindergarten, tree planting activities and marine environment cleaning in Nhon Chau island in Quy Nhơn, Bình Định Province. Phuong Khanh was appointed by Truong Quoc Phong, Provincial Director of Department of Culture, Sports and Tourism in Vietnam as the Tourism Ambassador of Bến Tre province from April 10, 2019 to December 31, 2021 and will work with the media and tourism promotion including the promotion of the coconut industry.

She graced the Vietnam International Fashion Week 2019 in Ho Chi Minh City in which she walked at the opening ceremony on April 11, 2019 and wore the creation of Chung Thanh Phong.

Phương Khánh became the celebrity cover of the international airline, VietJet Air inflight magazine One2Fly in May 2019. She was also featured in May 2019 in the "Proud Vietnam" project, a photo collection book to honor Vietnamese celebrities who won international pageant titles or global recognitions. She graced the launching of the Vietnam Áo dài Ambassador search in Ho Chi Minh City on May 16, 2019 to promote Vietnam’s national costume around the world.

She traveled to Réunion Island on June 2, 2019. Along with Miss Earth Air 2018, the Austrian, Melanie Mader, she attended the World Environment Day conference followed by a tree planting event on June 4, 2019 in Réunion Island. She delivered her speech during the environmental event with the theme "How to fight global warming effectively".

Phương Khánh reached Singapore on June 12, 2019 to promote environmental protection campaign and sat as one of the judges in the Miss Earth Singapore 2019. She assisted in the crowning of the eventual winner, Kimberly Ong as Singapore's representative in the Miss Earth 2019 pageant.

On June 21, 2019, she walked in the red carpet at the "A Diva You" fashion awards 2019 in Ho Chi Minh City with the theme "Rebellion in fashion" that took place at the White Palace Convention and Exhibition Center Pham Van Dong. In the said awards, she won Miss Elegant.

She made a trip to the United States on the last week of June 2019 as a special guest together with Miss Earth Air 2019 Melissa Flores of Mexico in the Miss Earth USA 2018 pageant in which she crowned Emanii Davis as the winner who will represent USA in the Miss Earth 2019. She also participated in the clean up for Flores Park in conjunction with Las Vegas Parks & Recreation and The Clean Earth Project.

She traveled to Japan in July 2019 and was greeted by students during her visit to Fukuoka Jo Gakuin University. Phương Khánh participated in clearing weeds and garbage by the river bank in Fukuoka City. She attended a welcome dinner hosted by the Japanese Education Association and expressed her intention to bridge cultural exchanges between Japan and Vietnam. She was designated as the ambassador of Japanese Language Association for non-native speakers and for international students in which she will participate in activities to meet, exchange and learn about the local Japanese training model. She also witnessed the signing of a cooperation agreement between the Japanese Language Association for Non-Kanji Using Learners (JLAN) with Dai Nam University to train and give opportunities for Vietnamese to study and work in Japan. She also visited the Vietnamese Consulate General in Fukuoka to talk about the welfare of Vietnamese people in Japan.

She was the cover of The Lifestyle Journalist Magazine based in India in the July 2019 edition with an exclusive interview regarding her feat in the Miss Earth pageant and her future plans. She then walked the red carpet for the launching of the "I Am Sunny" collections of Vietnamese designer, Chung Thanh Phong on July 6, 2019 which took place in Ho Chi Minh City, with the participation of Vietnamese showbiz stars.

She arrived in Colombia on August 20, 2019 with a grand welcome at the El Dorado International Airport to judge in the Miss Earth Colombia 2019 where she was reunited with Miss Earth Water 2018 Valeria Ayos. Along with the candidates of Miss Earth Colombia 2019, she visited the Colombian Ministry of Environment and Sustainable Development in Bogota and at the conclusion of the pageant, the jury which included Phương Khánh proclaimed Yenny Carrillo as the winner to participate in the Miss Earth 2019 in October in the Philippines.

On August 26, 2019, Phương Khánh and other Vietnamese celebrities called the attention of the media regarding the 2019 Amazon rainforest wildfires in which she shared an article on how people can help prevent the Amazon forest from being destroyed.

After her trip in Colombia, she proceeded to New Delhi, India and was joined by Miss Earth Water 2018, Valeria Ayos from Colombia to serve as one of the judges in the selection of Miss Earth India 2019 under the organization, Miss Divine Beauty Pageant in which she crowned Tejaswini Manogna as the winner on August 31, 2019. In addition to the pageant crowning, she also performed social work activities, tree planting, and environmental protection and community awareness campaign and received an "Award of Excellence" from The Earth Saviors Foundation based in India.

After the Miss Earth India 2019 final night, Phuong Khanh immediately moved to Malaysia as the representative of Carousel Productions and served as one of the jury for the Miss Earth Malaysia 2019 pageant that took place on September 6, 2019. A commemorative postage stamp with her photo was issued by the Government of Malaysia in honor to her visit to the country to promote environmental protection and to attend the Miss Earth Malaysia 2019.

During her reign as Miss Earth, she had traveled to the Philippines, Vietnam, Réunion Island, Singapore, United States, Japan, Colombia, India, Malaysia to fulfill her duties. She also spent her prize after winning the pageant and visited Hong Kong, Malaysia, The Netherlands, France, Belgium, Germany, and Australia to meet with her pageant sponsors, supporters, and relatives.

References

External links

Living people
1995 births
Miss Vietnam winners
Miss Earth 2018 contestants
Miss Earth winners
Vietnamese beauty pageant winners
Vietnamese female models
People from Bến Tre Province
Curtin University alumni
21st-century Vietnamese women